Aquarius (Latin for "water-bearer") is the eleventh astrological sign in the zodiac, originating from the constellation Aquarius. Under the tropical zodiac, the Sun is in the Aquarius sign between about January 20 and about February 18.

Myth

The water carrier represented by the zodiacal constellation Aquarius is Ganymede, a beautiful Phrygian youth. Ganymede was the son of Tros, king of Troy (according to Lucian, he was also the son of Dardanus). While tending to his father's flocks on Mount Ida, Ganymede was spotted by Zeus. The king of gods fell in love with him and flew down to the mountain in the form of a large bird, whisking Ganymede away to the heavens. Ever since, The boy has served as cupbearer to the gods. Ovid has Orpheus sing the tale.

Constellation

Aquarius is a winter constellation in the northern hemisphere, found near Pisces and Cetus. It is especially notable as the radiant for four meteor showers, the largest of which is the Southern Delta Aquariids in late July and early August.

Gallery

See also

Astronomical symbols
Chinese zodiac
Circle of stars
Cusp (astrology)
Elements of the zodiac

References

Notes

Works cited

 Longitude of Sun, apparent geocentric ecliptic of date, interpolated to find time of crossing 0°, 30°....

External links
 Warburg Institute Iconographic Database (over 300 medieval and early modern images of Aquarius) 

Western astrological signs